Marina Keller is a Swiss football player currently playing as a defender for FC Zürich in the Nationalliga A.

She started her career in 2000 in FFC Schwerzenbach, later absorbed by Grasshopper Club, where she spent ten years. In 2008, she was named the year0s best Swiss player. In 2010, she moved to Spain to play for Levante UD, and the next year she played in CE Sant Gabriel. In 2012, she returned to Switzerland, signing for Grasshopper's rival FC Zürich. She debuted in the UEFA Champions League with Zürich in August that year.

She is a member of the Swiss national team since 2007.

References

1984 births
Living people
People from Richterswil
Swiss expatriate sportspeople in Spain
Swiss women's footballers
Expatriate women's footballers in Spain
Primera División (women) players
Levante UD Femenino players
Switzerland women's international footballers
Swiss Women's Super League players
FC Zürich Frauen players
Women's association football defenders
Grasshopper Club Zürich (women) players
CE Sant Gabriel players
Sportspeople from the canton of Zürich
Swiss expatriate women's footballers